Edward Bevan may refer to:
 Edward Bevan (physician) (1770–1860), apiarist and physician
 Edward Bevan (bishop) (1861–1934), Bishop of Swansea and Brecon
 Edward John Bevan (1856–1921), British chemist
 Edward Vaughan Bevan (1907–1988), British doctor and Olympic gold medallist in rowing